Babis (Haralambos) Vovos (Greek: Μπάμπης (Χαράλαμπος) Βωβός) is a Greek businessman in construction. He is the owner of the Greek company Babis Vovos Constructions.

On 22 February 2013, the Greek property developer tycoon was arrested.

On 20 March 2018, it was announced in the Greek media that his private residence would be put to auction.

References

External links
BVIC Official Company Site /

Year of birth missing (living people)
Living people
Greek businesspeople